Barak Itzhaki (or Itzchaki, ; born September 25, 1984, in Ashkelon) is an Israeli former footballer. He mostly played a second striker, but could also play an attacking midfielder.

Early life
Itzhaki was born in Ashkelon, Israel, to a Jewish family.

Career 
Itzhaki started his professional career with boyhood club Hapoel Ashkelon. During his first two seasons as a professional, Itzhaki won the Toto Cup Artzit twice. He was sold to Beitar Jerusalem and saw limited time under manager Eli Ohana.

With the arrival of French manager Luis Fernández in 2005, Itzhaki received more playing time and was even a first team choice over the club's leading scorer, Lior Asulin. After watching Itzhaki play, Fernández told the club to sign Itzhaki to a long-term contract.

At the end of the 2005–06 season, Itzhaki attracted interest from Belgian club Racing Genk. Media reports say that he was offered a €300,000 per annum contract that includes a 20% yearly wage rise for a period no less than three seasons. Beitar was reluctant to see Itzhaki leave and they have put a price on the striker of no less than US$1,000,000. On June 25, 2006, an official bid was sent for the immediate transfer of Itzhaki but Beitar chairman Vladimir Sklar rejected the offer of USD $250,000. While Itzhaki and the club were in training in Arnhem, the Netherlands, a representative of Racing Genk showed up at the hotel with an improved offer of USD $500,000. It initially looked as if Itzhaki would be sold to the Belgian side  but he eventually signed a long-term contract with Beitar. In January 2008, Itzhaki agreed a move to Racing Genk, where he signed a 3.5 year contract.

He scored his first Racing Genk goal in KV Mechelen, it is already named as the goal of the year in Belgium. After this goal he also scored against Moeskroen en Club Brugge.

In July 2008, Itzhaki returned earlier as planned to Beitar Jerusalem due to home sickness. Once back in Jerusalem he became the top scorer of the 2008–09 Israeli Premier League.

Maccabi Tel Aviv
On June 9, 2010, Itzhaki signed a five-year-contract with Maccabi Tel Aviv for a transfer fee of two million USD paid to Beitar. He made his official debut for Maccabi at the home win against FK Mogren at UEFA Europa League on July 15, 2010.

On August 22, 2010, Itzhaki suffered a serious injury to his ACL against Maccabi Haifa and wasn't able to play until May 7, 2011. He made his return, replacing Maor Buzaglo in a league match against Maccabi Haifa, the same team he played against when he got injured, 32 fixtures and almost 9 months after that injury. He scored his first league goal for Maccabi by a penalty shot in the 87th minute of the last game of the season against Maccabi Netanya.

In the summer of 2012 Itzhaki was loaned to Anorthosis Famagusta. In that season Itzhaki was a vital part of team, scoring 13 league goals in 23 matches. Barak was the last (loan) transfer of Anorthosis for the season 2012-13 and was the most helpful transfer of the year, he scored 13 goals in the league and helped the team to achieve the second place.

Towards 2013–14 Itzhaki returned to Maccabi Tel Aviv, making his first game for the club since his return in the UEFA Champions League qualifying game against Győri ETO and accomplishing a great comeback to the club by scoring an important away goal.

Honours

Club
Hapoel Ashkelon
Toto Cup (Artzit) : Winner 2001–02, 2002–03
Beitar Jerusalem
Israeli Premier League : Winner 2006-07
Israel State Cup : Winner  2008-09
Toto Cup : Winner  2009-10
Anorthosis Famagusta
First Division : Runner-up 2012–13
Maccabi Tel Aviv
Israeli Premier League : Winner  2013–14, 2014–15
Israel State Cup : Winner 2014-2015
Toto Cup : Winner  2014-15 ,2017–18

Individual
 2008–09 Israeli Premier League top scorer
 January 2014 - UEFA's Goal of the Week

See also 

 List of Jewish footballers
 List of Jews in sports
 List of Israelis

References

External links
KRC Genk Profile

1984 births
Living people
Israeli Jews
Israeli footballers
Jewish footballers
Mizrahi Jews
Israel international footballers
Israel under-21 international footballers
Israeli Premier League players
Cypriot First Division players
Belgian Pro League players
Maccabi Tel Aviv F.C. players
Hapoel Ashkelon F.C. players
Beitar Jerusalem F.C. players
K.R.C. Genk players
Anorthosis Famagusta F.C. players
Israeli expatriate footballers
Expatriate footballers in Cyprus
Expatriate footballers in Belgium
Israeli expatriate sportspeople in Cyprus
Israeli expatriate sportspeople in Belgium
Footballers from Ashkelon
Israeli people of Yemeni-Jewish descent
Association football forwards